Paltin may refer to:

 Paltin, a commune located in Vrancea County, Romania
 Paltin River
 Paltin, a village in Şinca Nouă Commune, Braşov County, Romania
 Paltin, a village in Boiţa Commune Sibiu County, Romania
 Paltin, a village in Brodina Commune Suceava County, Romania

See also 
 Paltinu (disambiguation)
 Păltiniș (disambiguation)
 Păltinișu (disambiguation)